In Greek mythology, Neoptolemus, originally called Pyrrhus at birth, was the son of the warrior Achilles and the princess Deidamia, and the brother of Oneiros. He became the mythical progenitor of the ruling dynasty of the Molossians of ancient Epirus. In a reference to his pedigree, Neoptolemus was sometimes called Achillides (from his father Achilles' name) or, from his grandfather's or great-grandfather's names, Pelides or Aeacides.

Description 
In his Chronography the chronicler Malalas described Neoptolemus as "of good stature, good chest, thin, white, good nose, ruddy hair, wooly hair, light-eyed, big-eyed, blond eyebrows, blond beginnings of a beard, round-faced, precipitate, daring, agile, a fierce fighter". Meanwhile, in the account of Dares the Phrygian, he was described as "large, robust, and easily irritated. He lisped slightly, and was good-looking, with a hooked nose, round eyes, and shaggy eyebrows".

Background and Birth

In Cypria, Achilles sails to Skyros after a failed expedition to Troy, marries princess Deidamia and fathers Neoptolemus with her before being called to arms yet again.

In a non-Homeric version of the story, Achilles' mother Thetis had a vision many years before Achilles' birth that there would be a great war, and that her only son was to die in it if he partook. She tried to prevent him from being called to fight in the Trojan War by hiding him, disguised as a woman, in the court of Lycomedes, the king of Skyros. During his stay, Achilles had an affair with the princess, Deidamea, who then gave birth to Neoptolemus (originally called Pyrrhus, because his father had called himself Pyrrha, the female version of that name, while disguised as a woman). 

Most accounts mention Deidamia being Neoptolemus' mother, but in some accounts, he was the son of Achilles by Iphigenia instead. In those accounts, his father transported him to the island of Skyros after the sacrifice of his mother.

Trojan War 
The Greeks captured the Trojan seer Helenus and forced him to tell them under what conditions they could take Troy. Helenus revealed to them that they could defeat Troy if they could acquire the poisonous arrows of Heracles (then in the possession of Philoctetes); steal the Palladium (which led to the building of the famous wooden horse of Troy); and put Achilles' son in the war.

The Greeks then sent Odysseus to retrieve Neoptolemus, then a mere teenager, from Skyros.  The two then went to Lemnos to retrieve Philoctetes. (Years earlier, on the way to Troy, Philoctetes had been bitten by a snake on Chryse Island. Agamemnon had advised that he be left behind because the wound was festering and smelled bad. Philoctetes' retrieval is the plot of  Philoctetes, a play by Sophocles.

Some sources portray Neoptolemus as brutal. He killed at least six on the field of battle  and several more during the subsequent fall of Troy (Priam,  Eurypylus, Polyxena,  Polites and Astyanax (Hector and Andromache's infant son) among others). He captured Helenus, and made Andromache his concubine. The ghost of Achilles appeared to the survivors of the war, demanding the Trojan princess Polyxena to be sacrificed before anybody could leave for home; Neoptolemus was the one to carry out the sacrifice. (In scene (ll 566–575) of Euripides' play  Hekabe (also known as Hecuba) Neoptolemus is shown as a torn young man who kills Polyxena in the least painful way possible, contrasting with his usual brutal and uncompassionate image.) With Andromache, Helenus and Phoenix, Neoptolemus then sailed to the Epirot Islands and became the king of Epirus. 

By the enslaved Andromache, daughter of Cilician king Eëtion, Neoptolemus was the father of Molossos (and, according to the myth, therefore an ancestor of Olympias, the mother of Alexander the Great), Pielus, Pergamus and Amphialus.

Hyginus has a section on Amphialus:

Neoptolemus, son of Achilles and Deidamia, begat Amphialus by captive Andromache, daughter of Ēëtion. But after he heard that Hermione his betrothed had been given to Orestes in marriage, he went to Lacedaemon and demanded her from Menelaus. Menelaus did not wish to go back on his word, and took Hermione from Orestes and gave her to Neoptolemus. Orestes, thus insulted, slew Neoptolemus as he was sacrificing to Delphi, and recovered Hermione. The bones of Neoptolemus were scattered through the land of Ambracia, which is in the district of Epirus.

By Lanassa, granddaughter of Heracles, he fathered eight children.

Like in Euripides'  Hekabe, Sophocles' Philoctetes also shows him as a much kinder man, who honours his promises and shows remorse when he is made to trick Philoctetes.

After the War 
There are two differing accounts of Neoptolemus' death: he was either killed after he attempted to take Hermione from Orestes, or after he denounced Apollo, the murderer of his father. In the first case, he was killed by Orestes; in the second, the Delphic priests of Apollo took revenge.

After Neoptolemus' death his kingdom was partitioned. According to Virgil's Aeneid, Helenus (who later married Andromache) took part of it: "Helenus, a son of Priam, was king over these Greek cities of Epirus, having succeeded to the throne and bed of Pyrrhus..."

In art and literature
Neoptolemus is one of the main characters in Philoctetes, a tragedy by Sophocles.
Andromache, a tragedy by Euripides. Neoptolemus does not appear on stage but his death at Delphi is described
Apollodorus' Library, in Book 3 and in the Epitome 5.10-12, 5.21, 5.24
The Aeneid by Virgil
Trojan Women by Seneca
The Posthomerica, an epic poem by Quintus of Smyrna
In Historia Regum Britanniae, he enslaved Helenus and other Trojans in revenge for the death of his father
In Confessio Amantis Book 4 line 2161ff he is the slayer of the Amazon Penthesilea 
The Tragedy of Dido by Christopher Marlowe
Pyrrhus features in the player's speech in Shakespeare's Hamlet (Act 2, Scene 2) where his killing of Priam is described
The Second Part of the Iron Age, the final play in the Ages series by Thomas Heywood
Pyrrhus is a leading character in Andromaque (1667), a play by Jean Racine
Astianatte (1725), an opera by Leonardo Vinci
Andromaque (1780), an opera by Grétry based on Racine's play
Ermione (1819), an opera by Gioachino Rossini based on Racine's play
An Arrow's Flight, a novel by Mark Merlis (1998)
The Song of Troy, a novel written by Colleen McCullough (1998)
The Golden Prince, a novel written by Ken Catran (1999)
The Song of Achilles, a novel by Madeline Miller (2011)
The Silence of the Girls, a novel written by Pat Barker (2018)
Mentioned briefly in Euripides' plays Trojan Women and Hecuba, simply stating that Andromache, wife of Hector, was his promised spear bride.

Notes

References 

 Dares Phrygius, from The Trojan War. The Chronicles of Dictys of Crete and Dares the Phrygian translated by Richard McIlwaine Frazer, Jr. (1931-). Indiana University Press. 1966. Online version at theio.com
 Gaius Julius Hyginus, Fabulae from The Myths of Hyginus translated and edited by Mary Grant. University of Kansas Publications in Humanistic Studies. Online version at the Topos Text Project.
 Pausanias, Description of Greece with an English Translation by W.H.S. Jones, Litt.D., and H.A. Ormerod, M.A., in 4 Volumes. Cambridge, MA, Harvard University Press; London, William Heinemann Ltd. 1918. . Online version at the Perseus Digital Library
 Pausanias, Graeciae Descriptio. 3 vols. Leipzig, Teubner. 1903.  Greek text available at the Perseus Digital Library.
 Publius Ovidius Naso, The Epistles of Ovid. London. J. Nunn, Great-Queen-Street; R. Priestly, 143, High-Holborn; R. Lea, Greek-Street, Soho; and J. Rodwell, New-Bond-Street. 1813. Online version at the Perseus Digital Library.
 Publius Ovidius Naso. Amores, Epistulae, Medicamina faciei femineae, Ars amatoria, Remedia amoris. Edition by R. Ehwald; Rudolphi Merkelii; Leipzig. B. G. Teubner. 1907. Latin text available at the Perseus Digital Library.
 Publius Vergilius Maro, Aeneid. Theodore C. Williams. trans. Boston. Houghton Mifflin Co. 1910. Online version at the Perseus Digital Library.
 Publius Vergilius Maro, Bucolics, Aeneid, and Georgics. J. B. Greenough. Boston. Ginn & Co. 1900. Latin text available at the Perseus Digital Library.
 Publius Vergilius Maro, Bucolics, Aeneid, and Georgics. J. B. Greenough. Boston. Ginn & Co. 1900. Latin text available at the Perseus Digital Library.

External links

Achaean Leaders
Characters in the Aeneid
Ancient Epirotes
Characters in Greek mythology
Skyros
Greek regicides